Blooming Grove, also known as the Mandeville-Rogers House, is a historic plantation house located near Florence, Florence County, South Carolina.  It was originally constructed about 1790, with a two-story addition built between 1800 and 1820. It is an I-house form dwelling, with an Early Classical Revival two-story portico. Also on the property is a contributing brick-lined well. Blooming Grove is associated with Frank Mandeville Rogers (1857–1945), who promoted the growing of Bright Leaf tobacco in South Carolina. Rogers is believed to have owned 92 slaves, which were passed down to his wife and children after his death.

It was listed on the National Register of Historic Places in 2005.

References

Plantation houses in South Carolina
Houses on the National Register of Historic Places in South Carolina
Neoclassical architecture in South Carolina
Houses completed in 1790
Houses in Florence County, South Carolina
National Register of Historic Places in Florence County, South Carolina